This is a list of units of measurement based on human body parts or the attributes and abilities of humans (anthropometric units). It does not include derived units further unless they are also themselves human-based. These units are thus considered to be human scale and anthropocentric.

Area
Quinaria - the cross-sectional area of a pipe created from a flat sheet of lead 5 digits wide
Stremma - the amount of land a person can plow in a day

Length
Ald - the distance between a man's outstretched arms
Assbā - Arabic finger
Condylos - middle joint of finger
Cun - width of the human thumb, at the knuckle
Dactylos - Ancient Greek finger breadth
Digit - length of a human finger
Digitus - Ancient Roman digit
Etzba - fingerbreadth
Fathom - the distance between the fingertips of a man's outstretched arms
Finger
Fistmele - the measure of a clenched hand with the thumb extended
Gradus - Ancient Roman step
Hand - breadth of a male human hand
Klafter - German measure of outstretched hands
League - the distance a person can walk in an hour (by one definition)

Orgyia - Ancient Greek fathom
Parasang - the distance an infantryman could march in a predefined period of time
Pygmē - distance from elbow to base of fingers
Sazhen - Russian fathom
Shaftment - width of the fist and outstretched thumb
Span - width of a human hand, from the tip of the thumb to the tip of the little finger
Spithamē - Ancient Greek span
Zeret - Biblical span

Paces
Haploun bēma - Ancient Greek single pace
Orgye - Arabic pace
Pace - a full stride, from heel to heel
Passus - the pace step of a single legionary

Ells
Ell
Ell (Scots) - length of an average person's arm
Elle - German ell
Amah - Biblical ell

Cubits
Arsh - Arabic cubit
Cubit - length of the human forearm
Macedonian cubit
Cubitus - Ancient Roman cubit
Pēchys - Ancient Greek cubit

Palms
Cabda - Arabic palm
Chetvert/Piad - Russian span/palm
Palaistē/dōron - Ancient Greek palm
Palm - breadth of four fingers
Palmus - Ancient Roman palm
Tefah/Tefach - Biblical palm

Inches
Duym - Tatar thumb/inch
Inch - width of the thumb (by some definitions)
Uncia - Roman inch
Zoll - German inch

Feet
Foot - length of the human foot
Arabic foot
Fuß - German foot
Russian fut - Russian foot
Tatar fut - Tatar foot
Pes - Roman foot
Pous - Greek foot

Loudness
Phon
Sone

Mass
Picul - the weight a person can carry

Time
Nimesha - the time it takes for a person to blink
Paramanu - interval of blinking in humans

Volume
Choenix - a man's daily grain ration
Finger tip unit
Koku - the amount of rice needed to feed a person for a year
Japanese masu - the amount of rice needed to feed a person for a day

Miscellaneous
Garn - unit of measure for symptoms resulting from space adaptation syndrome; equal to complete incapacitation; named for Jake Garn

See also

Ancient Mesopotamian units of length
Anthropic units#In measurement, human scale units

 German obsolete units of measurement
History of measurement
Persian units of measurement
 Swedish units of measurement
Units of measurement
 Units of measurement in France before the French Revolution

Technology-related lists